The following is a list of German astronauts who have traveled into space, sorted by date of first flight.

As of 2018, eleven Germans have been in space. The first German, and only East German, in space was Sigmund Jähn in 1978. Three astronauts – Ulf Merbold, Reinhard Furrer and Ernst Messerschmid – represented West Germany during the time of divided Germany. Merbold made two other spaceflights after Germany was reunified in 1990; thus, he is the only German to have been in space three times. Thomas Reiter and Alexander Gerst are the only Germans to have made long-term spaceflights.

See also 
 German space programme

External links 
 German Astronauts at DLR
 Colleen Anderson: German Space Exploration and International Cooperation, American Institute for Contemporary German Studies, 17 October 2016.

Germany

Astronauts
astronauts